The National Union for Democracy and Progress can refer to:
National Union for Democracy and Progress (Benin)
National Union for Democracy and Progress (Cameroon)
National Union for Democracy and Progress (Central African Republic)
National Union for Democracy and Progress (Guinea-Bissau)
National Union for Democracy and Progress (São Tomé and Príncipe)